USS Washington (SSN-787) is a  nuclear powered attack submarine of the United States Navy. The contract to build her was awarded to Huntington Ingalls Industries in partnership with the Electric Boat division of General Dynamics in Newport News, Virginia, on 22 December 2008. This boat is the fourth of the Block III submarines which will feature a revised bow, including some technology from  SSGNs. Construction began on 2 September 2011 at Newport News Shipbuilding in Virginia. On 13 April 2012, Secretary of the Navy Ray Mabus, announced SSN-787 would be named after the State of Washington, which was celebrated during a naming ceremony in Seattle on 7 February 2013. The Navy christened Washington on 5 March 2016, during a ceremony at Newport News Shipbuilding in Newport News, Virginia.

Crest
The crest contains images including Mount Rainier, the Seattle skyline, evergreen trees, and silhouettes of the previous two USS Washingtons.

The central image is of the submarine, coming forth from the waters of the Puget Sound. The paint scheme is of local Native American art depicting an orca, the state's official marine mammal.

Along the top of the state border, six hollow stars represent previous naval vessels named for George Washington with two solid-gold stars representing the previous ships named for the state.   At the bottom, silver and gold submarine dolphins, represent the enlisted and officer warfare insignia, respectively, sit atop a block of battleship armor plating.

The motto, "Preserving Peace, Prepared for War", is derived from a quote from George Washington, "To be prepared for war is one of the most effective means of preserving peace." 
 
Set behind the state is a ring adorned with the official Washington state tartan colored green (for the evergreen forests), blue (for the lakes, rivers, and ocean), white (for the snow-capped mountains), red (for the apple and cherry crops), yellow (for the wheat and grain crops), and black (for the eruption of Mount St. Helens).

Battlecry
Orca, more commonly known as killer whales, are referred to as "blackfish" by the Native Americans of the Pacific Northwest. This led to the crew unofficially referring to USS Washington as "The Blackfish", and gave rise to the battlecry "Fear the Blackfish".

References

 

Virginia-class submarines
Nuclear submarines of the United States Navy
Ships built in Newport News, Virginia